The 1948 Los Angeles Rams season was the team's 11th year with the National Football League and the third season in Los Angeles. The Rams debuted the first helmet logo in league history in 1948, an idea that was conceived by running back Fred Gehrke. The season opener against the Lions was the final Wednesday night game in the NFL until a 2012 Wednesday game between the Cowboys and Giants. In his first NFL game, future Pro Football Hall of Famer Tom Fears scored twice in the fourth quarter, and had his only pick-six of his career in a 44–7 victory.

Draft

Schedule

Standings

References

Los Angeles Rams
Los Angeles Rams seasons
Los Angeles